The discography of Screaming Trees, an Ellensburg, Washington-based rock band, consists of eight studio albums, three compilation albums, five extended plays (EP), and six singles, though this does not include any solo material recorded by the individual members of Screaming Trees.

Vocalist Mark Lanegan, guitarist Gary Lee Conner, bassist Van Conner, and drummer (1985-1991) Mark Pickerel formed Screaming Trees in 1985, soon signing to the independent label Velvetone Records and releasing the Other Worlds EP. The Screaming Trees' debut album, Clairvoyance, came out in 1986. The same year Screaming Trees signed with punk label SST Records and released the second full-length album, Even If and Especially When. The band would later release two more albums under SST Records, then signed with Epic Records in 1990. In 1991, the Screaming Trees released its first album for a major label, Uncle Anesthesia.

Sweet Oblivion, released in 1992 and their first album with new drummer Barrett Martin, brought the band to a new level of commercial success, and the Screaming Trees found itself amidst the sudden popularity of the Seattle music scene. In 1996, the band released its seventh studio album, Dust; while successful, the album could not emulate the precedent set by Sweet Oblivion. Screaming Trees disbanded in 2000 due to conflicts among the members regarding the band's creative direction.

Studio albums

Compilation albums

Extended plays

Singles

Music videos

Other appearances

References

General

Specific

External Links
 

Discographies of American artists
Rock music group discographies